Dotson is a Welsh surname originating from the Cheshire region. This surname is a patronymic of the Middle English name "Dodde." Originally derived from the Germanic root "dodd" meaning "something rounded", used to denote a short, rotund man . Notable people with this surname include:

Alphonse Dotson (born 1943), American football player
Amber Dotson, American country singer
Bob Dotson, American broadcast journalist
Carlton Dotson, American college basketball player and murderer
Chastity Dotson, American actress
Damyean Dotson, American basketball player
Demar Dotson (born 1985), American football player
Devon Dotson (born 1999), American basketball player
Earl Dotson (born 1970), American football player
Gary Dotson, American exonerated of a criminal conviction by DNA evidence
Jahan Dotson (born 2000), American football player
Jimmy Dotson (1933–2017), American blues singer, guitarist and drummer 
Kevin Dotson (disambiguation), multiple people
Lionel Dotson (born 1985), American football player
Richard Dotson (born 1959), American baseball player
Santana Dotson (born 1969), American football player
Sam Dotson (born 1970), American police commissioner in St. Louis

See also 
Dotson, Minnesota
Dodson (disambiguation)